Lepyronia gibbosa, known generally as the hill-prairie spittlebug or great plains spittlebug, is a species of spittlebug in the family Aphrophoridae. It is found in North America.

References

External links

 

Articles created by Qbugbot
Insects described in 1899
Aphrophoridae